Aslanbek Alborov (born 2 April 1991 in Vladikavkaz) is a Russian freestyle wrestler of Ossetian descent, who represents Azerbaijan in the light heavyweight division (97 kg). World freestyle wrestling bronze medallist. He is a silver medallist in the World Cup 2018. He won the Ali Aliyev Memorial 2017 in Dagestan.

In World Cup 2017 he beat P4P No. 1 Kyle Snyder of Ohio, United States. A year later Alborov faced Snyder and beat him again in Yashar Dogu international 2018.

Championships and achievements
Senior:
Yashar Dogu 2017 - 1st (97 kg)
Yashar Dogu 2018 - 1st (97 kg)
Ali Aliyev Memorial 2017 - 1st (97 kg)
World Cup 2017 - 3rd
World Cup 2018 - 2nd 
Intercontinental Cup 2017 - 1st (97 kg)
Moscow Lights (Al-Rosa cup) 2014 - 2nd 
World Championship 2017 - 3rd

References

1991 births
Living people
Russian male sport wrestlers
Ossetian people
People from Vladikavkaz
Russian people of Ossetian descent
World Wrestling Championships medalists